Golden Throne may refer to:
 Golden Throne (Mysore)
 Golden Throne (mountain), a rock formation in Utah, USA
 A name given to the mountain Baltoro Kangri by European explorers 
 The official throne for the king of Bhutan
 The seat of the Emperor of Mankind in the Warhammer 40,000 fictional universe